Line Fruensgaard (formerly Daugaard; born 17 July 1978) is a former Danish team handball player and Olympic champion. She received a gold medal with the Danish national team at the 2004 Summer Olympics in Athens.

References

External links

1978 births
Living people
Danish female handball players
Olympic gold medalists for Denmark
Handball players at the 2004 Summer Olympics
Olympic medalists in handball
Medalists at the 2004 Summer Olympics